Barbagia (or ) is a geographical, cultural and natural region of inner Sardinia, contained for the most part in the province of Nuoro and Ogliastra and located alongside the Gennargentu massif.

The name comes from Cicero, who described the land as inhabited by barbarians; Roman domination over this part of the island was in fact never more than nominal as a result of the Roman-Sardinian Wars. This word shares its etymology with the now antiquated Barbary.

The Sardinians, many of whose revolts came from this area, were also mocked by the ancient Romans with the pejorative term  'thieves wearing rough woolen garments'.

In 594, Pope Gregory the Great wrote a letter to Hospito, a Christian whom he calls the "leader of the Barbaricini". Hospito apparently permitted the evangelisation of pagan Barbagia by Christian missionaries.

The latter two are named after a sub-region, and the others after their main villages.

The area is full of hard hills and mountains, and there is little human presence. Barbagia is one of the least populated areas in Europe, which has allowed Barbagia to preserve better the island's cultural and natural treasures. According to a thesis by the archaeologist Giovanni Lilliu, Sardinian history has always been characterised by what he called the "constant of Sardinian resistance", opposed to the invaders who attempted at various times to lord over the indigenous inhabitants. Barbagia is one of the few Sardinian regions where the Sardinian language in its own varieties, both Nuorese and Campidanese, is still spoken on an everyday basis, while the rest of the island has already mostly undergone thorough Italianization and language shift to Italian.

One of the most important villages is Gavoi. Orgosolo was famous for its bandits and kidnappers and typical murals. Oliena is well known for its wines (especially the Nepente, a  wine made with Cannonau grapes). Another well known town is Fonni, the highest town in Sardinia at more than 1,000 meters above sea level. Fonni is also the gateway to the Gennargentu mountain system.

The economy consists of agriculture, sheep breeding, art and tradition related business, tourism and light industry.

See also 
Roman-Sardinian Wars
Cantu a tenore

References 

Geography of Sardinia
Geographical, historical and cultural regions of Italy
Blue zones
Natural regions of Europe
History of Sardinia